Vinmeengal is a 2012 Tamil film written and directed by Vignesh Menon. The film had its audio launch held on 16 February 2012. The movie is based on a true life incident revolving around the life of a physically challenged protagonist. It stars actors Rahul Ravindran and Anuja Iyer in lead. The film score is composed by Jubin, while cinematography is by Anand Jeeva  and editing handled by G. Sasikumar. Vinmeengal opened to mixed reviews.

Cast
Rahul Ravindran as Jeeva
Vishva as Naren
Shikha as Meera
Anuja Iyer as Ila
Pandiarajan as Panchu

Soundtrack 
Soundtrack was composed by Jubin.
"Ariya Paruvathil" - Bombay Jayashree
"Vazhi Maari" - Ajesh
"Un Paarvai" - Hariharan, Harini
"Nee Kaattil" - Shankar Mahadevan
"Bhoomi Yengum" - Belly Raj

Critical reception
Times of India wrote "Vinmeengal, the debut effort of Vignesh Menon, showcases the potential within this budding filmmaker and the fresh cast, but in the end, you are likely to be left with mixed feelings. The director gives you an emotionally-charged story in the film's first half with characters that are immensely likeable, but criminally ignores them in the second half to deal with characters and events that aren't half as engaging". Behindwoods wrote "Vinmeengal is likely to work with the audience who would patronize serious and emotion laden films but not for consumers of commercial cinema". Sify wrote "On the whole, Vinmeengal is a clean and honest film with noble intentions and hats off to Vignesh".

References

2012 films
2010s Tamil-language films
Indian drama films
Films about people with cerebral palsy
2012 directorial debut films
2012 drama films